Zayats (meaning hare) is a gender-neutral Slavic surname. Notable people with the surname include:

Mikhail Zayats (born 1981), Russian mixed martial artist
Vadym Zayats (born 1974), Ukrainian football midfielder
Anatoly V. Zayats (born 1963), Ukrainian-British experimental physicist

See also
Zaytsev

Russian-language surnames